Huge is a creative growth acceleration company, founded in Dumbo, Brooklyn, in 1999.

History 
Huge was founded by David Skokna, Sasha Kirovski, Gene Liebel, and Aaron Shapiro. Skokna and Kirovski, friends and colleagues at Deutsch, first established the company out of Skokna's apartment in 1999.

Huge's first client was IKEA who hired the firm to redesign its websites. Between 2005 and 2010, Huge also won and launched web design initiatives for JetBlue, CNN, Reuters, Four Seasons, Pepsi, and Target.

In 2008 The Interpublic Group acquired a stake in Huge for close to $40 million. In 2009, Huge was named the fastest-growing company across all marketing disciplines by Advertising Age.

In 2010, Pepsi announced it was working with Huge on the Pepsi Refresh project, using social media to fund public good projects. Later that year, Aaron Shapiro was named CEO and IPG announced an investment of between $8 million and $10 million to accelerate global expansion for Huge with new offices in Brazil, China, Singapore, and Japan. At this time Skokna and Kirovski departed Huge.

In 2011, Huge launched a UX School program offering about 12-week UX apprenticeships and opened offices in Rio de Janeiro and London. In 2011, Huge also began working with HBO to design and launch HBO GO, leading to the adoption of streaming TV initiatives by most cable TV brands. Huge would later work with Fox, FX Now, The Simpsons, and Hulu on direct-to-consumer TV initiatives.

In 2013, Huge opened a production studio to support its expansion from product and web design into marketing as the company took on integrated marketing work for Samsung and was named social media AOR for Audi. In 2013, Huge also launched the first redesign of New York City's municipal website in a decade.

The company announced in a March 2018 statement that Shapiro would depart the company after 13 years of overseeing the growth of the company. Michael Koziol replaced Shapiro as CEO. In May 2019 it was announced Publicis Groupe veteran Pete Stein would replace Michael Koziol as CEO. In June 2021, IPG named Mat Baxter the company's Global Chief Executive Officer.

In July 2022, Huge laid off 3% of its global workforce in response to a revenue drop caused by clients cancelling or pausing activities, and signed a lease to create a 71,000 square foot Global Experience Center at Dock 72 in the Brooklyn Navy Yard.

References

External links
 
 Net Magazine Profile: HUGE

Companies based in New York City
Advertising agencies of the United States
 
Digital marketing companies of the United States